Clonazolam (also known as clonitrazolam) is a drug of the triazolobenzodiazepine (TBZD) class, which are benzodiazepines (BZDs) fused with a triazole ring. It has had very little research done about its effects and metabolism, and has been sold online as a designer drug.

The synthesis of clonazolam was first reported in 1971 and the drug was described as the most active compound in the series tested.

Clonazolam is reported to be highly potent and concerns have been raised that it and flubromazolam in particular may pose comparatively higher risk than other designer benzodiazepines due to their ability to produce strong sedation and amnesia at as little as 0.5 mg.

Legality

United Kingdom 
In the UK, clonazolam has been classified as a Class C drug by the May 2017 amendment to The Misuse of Drugs Act 1971 along with several other designer benzodiazepine drugs.

United States 
It is a Schedule I medicine in Virginia, Louisiana, North Carolina and Oregon and is not FDA approved for human consumption. Virginia State Law has declared all of the following medications are now schedule I: clonazolam, etizolam, flualprazolam, flubromazolam, and flubromazepam.  Minnesota declared clonazolam a Schedule I drug in August 2020. The DEA had announced their intent to place the substance under control, in December 2022.

Australia 
In Australia, clonazolam is Schedule 9 under federal law.

Sweden 
Sweden's public health agency suggested classifying clonazolam as a hazardous substance on June 1, 2015.

Effects
Clonazolam's effects are similar to other benzodiazepines, such as anxiolysis, disinhibition, lethargy, muscle relaxation, and euphoria. While no dose of clonazolam is considered "safe" due to its lack of research and extreme potency, doses higher than 0.5 mg can cause benzodiazepine overdose in some individuals. The effects of a benzodiazepine overdose include sedation, confusion, amnesia, insufficient breathing, loss of consciousness, and death. Because dependence can occur in a short period of time, or even with a large initial dose, withdrawal symptoms (including seizures and death) may occur acutely following the period of intoxication.

See also 

 Adinazolam
 Alprazolam
 Clonazepam, no triazole ring
 Estazolam, (licensed)
 Flubromazolam
 Pyrazolam
 Triazolam

References 

Triazolobenzodiazepines
Nitrobenzodiazepines
Chloroarenes
Designer drugs
GABAA receptor positive allosteric modulators